The men's 1500 metres event at the 2003 IAAF World Indoor Championships was held on March 14–15.

Medalists

Results

Heats
First 2 of each heat (Q) and next 3 fastest (q) qualified for the semifinals.

Final

References
Results

1500
1500 metres at the World Athletics Indoor Championships